Kanj or KANJ may refer to:

Name Kanj generally means Lord Brahma, is of Indian origin, Name Kanj is a Masculine (or Boy) name. Person with name Kanj are mainly Hindu by religion.
KANJ (FM), a radio station (91.1 FM) in Giddings, Texas, United States
Kanj, India, a village in Gujarat, India; named after Kanji Thaker
Kanj, Iran, a village in Kerman Province, Iran
KANJ, ICAO code for Sault Ste. Marie Municipal Airport (Sanderson Field) in Sault Ste. Marie, Michigan, United States